Canvastown is a locality at the point where the Wakamarina River joins the Pelorus River, in Marlborough, New Zealand.  runs through the area. Rai Valley is 17 km to the northwest. Havelock is 10 km to the east.

The town was founded in 1864, after gold was discovered in the Wakamarina Valley. Up to 6000 miners came to make their fortunes. Where there had previously been a Māori Pā, streets of tents sprang up providing accommodation, restaurants and taverns to a population of about 3000 people. About  of gold was recovered in 1864.

The surface gold was worked out within two years and most of the miners moved to new gold discoveries on the West Coast. Steam dredges continued to work the river into the 20th century.

Canvastown School is a coeducational full primary (years 1-8) school with a decile rating of 5 and a roll of 29. The school was built in 1877 and celebrated its 125th Jubilee in 2002.

Marae

Te Hora Marae is located in Canvastown. It is the marae (meeting ground) of Ngāti Kuia and includes Te Hora wharenui (meeting house).

In October 2020, the Government committed $32,318 from the Provincial Growth Fund to upgrade the marae, creating four jobs.

See also

Maungatapu murders

References

External links
 Local history

Populated places in the Marlborough Region